Buxy is a commune in the Saône-et-Loire department in the region of Bourgogne-Franche-Comté in eastern France.

History

Buxy was the property of count of Chalon until 1237, when Buxy became the property of the Dukes of Burgundy. In 1477, Louis XI make of Buxy a part of the French kingdom and was named Buxy-le-Royal. En 1565, Buxy became the property of the prince of Condé later property of the Counts of Soissons, they sold Buxy in 1626 to the marquis of Uxelles. Buxy was the headquarters of a medieval hospital, attached with the hospital of Tournus in the 17th century.

Economy

The economy of Buxy is mainly based on wine growing.

Transportation
The closest airport to Buxy is Lyon Airport (110 km).

See also
 Asteroid 375007 Buxy
 Communes of the Saône-et-Loire department
 Côte Chalonnaise
 Montagny wine

References

 Tourist Office of Buxy

Communes of Saône-et-Loire